The Federation of Malaya Independence Act 1957 (1957 c. 60 5 and 6 Eliz 2) was an Act of Parliament in the United Kingdom. It came into operation on 31 July 1957.

The Act made provisions for the nation of Federation of Malaya (formerly the Protected States of Johor, Kedah, Kelantan, Negeri Sembilan, Pahang, Perak, Perlis, Selangor, and Terengganu) and the Settlements of Penang and Malacca to gain an independent sovereign country within and become a member of the Commonwealth of Nations on 31 August 1957; prior to this, Federation of Malaya (formerly Malay States) had been a fully self-governing British colony.

History

The Malayan Union came into being in 1946. It was established by British Malaya and comprised the Federated Malay States (Perak, Selangor, Negeri Sembilan, Pahang), the Unfederated Malay States (Kedah, Perlis, Kelantan, Terengganu, Johor) and the Straits Settlements of Penang and Malacca. In a series of agreements between the British and the Malayan Union, the Malayan Union was superseded by the Federation of Malaya on 1 February 1948.

After extensive work to stabilize the political situation and reduce racial tensions, the British government finally ceded full autonomy to the Federation of Malaya on August 31, 1957, and the country achieved independence, led by the inaugural prime minister Tunku Abdul Rahman, who remained in office until 1970.

See also

Hari Merdeka (Independence Day)
Malayan Declaration of Independence
United Nations Security Council Resolution 125

References

External links
 The UK Statute Law Database: Federation of Malaya Independence Act 1957
Chronological table of the statutes; HMSO, London. 1993. 

History of Malaysia
Independence acts in the Parliament of the United Kingdom
Malaysian Independence
United Kingdom Acts of Parliament 1957
1957 in Malaya
Malaysia–United Kingdom relations
Malaysia and the Commonwealth of Nations
United Kingdom and the Commonwealth of Nations